Lippa may refer to:

 Lippa (sport) a game played in southern Europe and the Indian subcontinent
 Lippa, Ioannina, Ioannina, Greece
 Hungarian name for Lipova, a town in Arad County, Romania
 Kislippa, the Hungarian name for Lipa, Beltinci, Slovenia

People with the surname
 Andrew Lippa, composer/lyricist
 Jeffrey Lippa, American actor

See also 
 Talpanas lippa (Kaua'i mole duck), an extinct species of duck
 Lipa (disambiguation)
 Lipovica (disambiguation)
 Lipovice (disambiguation), Czech Republic
 Lipowice, Poland